Gabriela Vianna Cé (born 3 March 1993) is a Brazilian professional tennis player.

She has won one WTA 125 doubles title, with eleven singles titles and 21 doubles titles on the ITF Circuit. On 9 September 2019, she reached her best singles ranking of world No. 221. On 18 April 2016, she peaked at No. 109 in the WTA doubles rankings.

Playing for the Brazil Fed Cup team, Cé has a win–loss record of 11–9.

Grand Slam singles performance timelines

WTA career finals

Doubles: 1 (runner–up)

WTA 125 tournament finals

Doubles: 1 (title)

ITF Circuit finals

Singles: 27 (11 titles, 16 runner–ups)

Doubles: 43 (21 titles, 22 runner–ups)

Notes

References

External links
 
 
 

1993 births
Living people
Sportspeople from Porto Alegre
Brazilian female tennis players
Tennis players at the 2015 Pan American Games
Pan American Games competitors for Brazil